Druha Rika (also Druga Rika) is a Ukrainian rock band from Zhytomyr. The band's style is determined as Brit Pop. Druha Rika released seven studio albums and two compilations. The name of the band means Second river.

Members 
Current members
 Valeriy Kharchyshyn — lead vocals, trumpet, lyrics (1996 — present)
 Oleksandr Baranovsky — guitar (1996 — present)
 Oleksiy Doroshenko — drums (1996 — present)
 Serhiy Belichenko — guitar (1998 — present)
 Serhiy Hera (Shura) — keyboards, backing vocals (2003 — present)
 Andriy Lavrinenko - bass (2014 — present)

Former members
 Taras Melnichuk — guitar (1997 — 1998)
 Viktor Skurativsky — bass (1996 — 2014)

Discography 
Albums
 2000 — Я є (Pronounces: ″Ya ye″, Eng. ″I am″) 
 2003 — Два (Pronounces: ″Dva″, Eng. ″Two″)
 2005 — Рекорди (Pronounces: ″Rekordy″, Eng. ″Recordings″)
 2008 — Мода (Pronounces: ″Moda″, Eng. ″Fashion″)
 2012 — Metanoia. Part 1 (Eng. ″Rethinking″)
 2014 — Supernation
 2017 — Піраміда (Pronounces: ″Piramida″, Eng. ″Pyramid″)

Compilations
 2006 — Денніч (Pronounces: ″Dennich″, Eng. ″Day-Night″) 
 2009 — THE BEST

Links 
 Official page
 «Twitter
 LastFm
 Lyrics
 YouTube

Ukrainian rock music groups
Musical groups established in 1996
1996 establishments in Ukraine
Zhytomyr